"Genie" is a song recorded by South Korean girl group Girls' Generation for their second extended play (EP) of the same name (2009). It was released on June 22, 2009, as a single from the EP. Written by Yoo Young-jin, and composed by Dsign Music, Fridolin Nordso and Yoo Young-jin, the song is the group's first collaboration with Western composers and producers, which was later encouraged towards their future music.

Musically, "Genie" carried on the group's phase of bubblegum pop music from their debut. Lyrically, the song discusses the elements of love and relationships, alongside granting the wishes of their partner. It received generally positive reviews from music critics, many of whom highlighted the track as one of the highlights on the EP. The single was well received domestically, achieving the top spots on music programs Inkigayo and Music Bank.

A Japanese-language version of the song was recorded for the group's eponymous Japanese debut album and was released as their debut single in Japan on September 8, 2010. It was a commercial success in the country, peaking at number four on the Oricon Singles Chart and number eight on the RIAJ Digital Track Chart. The single received certifications by the Recording Industry Association of Japan on three platforms–physical sales (gold), digital sales (platinum), and chaku-uta (platinum). The song was included on the setlists of Girls' Generation's several concert tours, including Into the New World (2010), The First Japan Arena Tour (2011), and Girls' Generation Tour (2011).

Background and composition

There are two versions of "Genie"; a Korean version, and a Japanese version. Both versions were composed by Norwegian production team Dsign Music members; Anne Judith Wik, Robin Jenssen, Ronny Svendsen, and Nermin Harambašić, alongside additional composing by Fridolin Nordsø and Yoo Young-jin. The Korean version was written by Yoo Young-jin, whilst the Japanese version was written by Kanata Nakamura. Young-jin had originally composed a demo melody for an undisclosed artist outside of the group's label S.M. Entertainment. However, S.M. Entertainment purchased the rights for the song and decided to recommend it to Girls' Generation; as a result, Young-jin re-composed the demo whilst Korean composer Yoo Han Jin re-arranged it.

The song was originally composed in English as "I Just Wanna Dance", but Young-Jin decided to scrap the idea after both sets of lyrics were written. Both versions were the groups' first singles to be composed and produced by Western producers, and had continued with future musical releases. Musically, both versions carried on the groups phase of bubblegum pop music since their debut in 2007. According to Chucky Eddy from Spin, he found that the composition was inspired by "super-light-footed Italo disco..." A staff reviewer from CD Journal noticed musical elements of electropop and said the lyrics incorporates metaphorical uses of a lamp, genie, and Aladdin as themes of love and lust.

Critic Lee Mun-won says that the song employs inspirations from trance and writes that the song itself is "more sophisticated than authentic europop."

Release
"Genie" was released digitally on June 22, 2009, in South Korea. In Japan, the song was released on September 8, 2010, as the group's debut Japanese single. The Japanese Maxi CD and DVD format of the single contains the Japanese version, the Korean version, and the karaoke version of the former. A limited edition CD and DVD format was released in both Japan and Taiwan; it featured a 14-paged booklet of photos, lyrics, and credits to the single, the original Japanese Maxi CD and DVD tracks, all housed in a digipak. The cover sleeve for both formats features Girls' Generation in different black and gold dresses, all standing in front of a white backdrop.

Reception
"Genie" received generally positive reviews from music critics. Chucky Eddy from Spin highlighted "Genie" as one of the best tracks from their self-titled album. A staff reviewer from CD Journal reviewed the group's debut greatest hits album The Best. The reviewer commended the track by labelling it an "impressive 'lets dance'" track with "high quality" vocal performances by each member. Another reviewer from the same publication reviewed the single's release, and labelled it "sophisticated". Chris True from AllMusic reviewed the groups biography, and selected "Genie" as one of the best tracks throughout their career. Billboard chose the song as the best song in their career. Commercially, the song reached #5 on Oricon Charts on the releasing day. The song reached #2 on September 11, 2010.  The single sold 115,575 physical units in Japan in 2010. It was selected by iTunes Japan as the #1 Breakthrough Album of 2010 on 2010: Music, 2010 BEST chart.

Music video

Rino Nakasone Razalan choreographed the dance in all the videos.

Original video 
The teaser video was released at 9:20 p.m. (KST) on June 19, 2009. Later, the original video was released on June 26, 2009. 

In the music video, Yoona appears first sitting in a large lamp, the other members sitting around her. The music video cuts back and forth between the group performing the choreography and scenes from three separate rooms occupied by three different members each. Yoona, Yuri and Jessica are in a large pink bedroom, Tiffany, Taeyeon and Sunny are in a disco bar, while Sooyoung and Hyoyeon are in a room with a large cake from which Seohyun then pops out. The girls wear white uniforms and perform on a long runway-like stage with a large heart in the background, while on the other they are in khaki uniforms with the words "GIRLS' GENIE" in the background. The music video frequently shows the girls interacting with the camera and with arms that sometimes extend from either side of the screen to give the impression that the girls are interacting with the viewer personally whereas stage sequences have heavy, flashy lights and moving spotlights to give strong and bright effects. 

The music video was uploaded on SMTOWN's YouTube channel on February 26, 2010.

3D version
On October 24, 2010, a 3D music video of the Korean version, was released for Samsung PAVV LED TV. The video begins with all nine girls sitting down, looking into crystal balls, then cutting into the beginning of the song with "Girls Generation" written in pink, sparkly lettering. The video features three dance sequences, one of which features a floor with cosmic-like sparkles coming out of it. During the video, it cuts to solo scenes of the girls playing with the crystal balls, inside are a man and a woman standing awkwardly beside each other at a bus stop, beside them is a poster with "I Wish" printed on it, and a red Mini Convertible is below it. The girls are then seen changing the couples clothes, and making the Mini appear out of the poster, signifying the girls are 'genies' and granting their wishes. The video ends with the girls waving goodbye to the couple, who then drive off in the car, with the number '37' printed on the side. 

The outfits worn by the girls follow the typical 'military' style like in the original version, with two costumes being used. While the all white costume with navy-esque hat reappear, the black coat, tie, short-shorts, and white undershirt replaces the khaki uniforms.

Japanese version 
The music video teaser was released August 16, 2010, and the full music video was released August 25, 2010, it was also their first video to be filmed in Japan. It begins with a young boy (EXO's Chanyeol) who found an old lamp and a scale model of a circus tent in an old attic. After rubbing the lamp, the camera zooms inside the tent where the Girls' Generation can be seen coming to life as the song begins to play. The girls then alternately switch to different costumes as the boy rubs the lamp once again, where in they are seen on an old television screen with a huge candy cane and colorful balloons. The music video ends with the boy rubbing the lamp again before magically disappearing into another scene where he is walking out of a limousine with Girls' Generation members meeting him on the red carpet at a premiere event. It is implied that his wish had been granted by lamp. There are also individual close-up scenes of members dressed in old fashioned pink shirts.

Most of the choreography remains the same as the Korean version, with a slight tweak to some of the steps. The difference is that in the Japanese version there are some parts where member Taeyeon moves to the front position to sing her solo verse before going back and rejoining the other girls to form a line. While in the Korean version, Taeyeon does not do this. Also, all the girls pose with a hand salute at the end. In the Korean version, only member Seohyun does it as her "end pose". A dance version was also released which features the girls wearing their brown soldier uniforms which were one of the costumes that they wore in the music video.

Live performances
On stage, the girls were given a "military" concept for their performance of "Genie", dressing mostly in tight military jackets, miniskirts, and/or hot pants. The colours were mostly white navy shirts, khaki brown, and red, although various uniforms were shown. The group wished to show a mature image, in comparison to the innocence portrayed during "Gee". The choreography of the song, done by Rino Nakasone Razalan, was focused on synchronization and seductive images. Parts of the choreography became popular in Korea, including the "Jegi-kicking dance" and the "Leg-beauty dance".

The song has been performed on two SM Town tours, In 2010, using the "Rock Tronic" remix, which was also used on their first tour, and then again in 2011 for the continuation of the 2010 SMTown tour. The remix contains a rock inspired dance-break, where the girls perform in-sync routines, the echo of the line "Sowoneul Marhaebwa" ("Tell me your wish") can be heard, also. The group's first performance for the mini-album was on June 26 on KBS Music Bank. Within a few days, the song topped on 10 different digital music charts. The song was also rewarded as the most popular album and ringtone downloads.

"Genie" was featured as the opening number for the Girls' first Japan tour, and on the 2nd Asia tour. The performance begins with the girls appearing from an odd-shaped cocoon-like prop, where they are assembled in the shape of a pyramid; Taeyeon on top, followed by Jessica and Tiffany, then the remaining girls, Seohyun, Hyoyeon, Sunny, Yoona, Yuri and Sooyoung, on the third level. The song starts with Taeyeon singing the first line of Genie, and then is repeated by Jessica, Tiffany and Yoona, and then again by the remaining girls, then, the girls begin to sing the song. The remix features a rap interlude performed by Tiffany; "Welcome to my show, it's a revolution, this is my Girls' Generation / Everyone rock with me, take it in all right / Get hype! Jump! Let's party all night / I know we the ones to make you super crazy / Wanna be your genie more than one night / Watchin' me, feelin' me, callin' my name / I just want you and me to feel the same / Come on and move it, put your hands up in the air / Everybody lose control, and hands up in the air."

After the rap, Tiffany replaces the word "DJ" in the line "DJ, put it back on," with the specific city, or venue, they are performing at. When they performed at Japan, for example, Tiffany would say, "Japan, put it back on!". During their performance of the song at the 62nd NHK Kohaku Uta Gassen in 2011, Tiffany says "Akagumi, put it back on!" as they were part of the all-female Akagumi (red team). On January 14, 2013, they performed the song on the Philippines' Dream K-Pop Fantasy Concert, Tiffany said, "Philippines, put it back on!".

Other versions and plagiarism issues
Issues of plagiarism were caused by Uzbek singer Dineyra's song "Raqsga Tushgin." It was revealed that although the release of her song preceded the release of Girls' Generation's second mini-album, the Uzbekistan singer's song was recorded without obtaining proper permission from Universal Music, thus plagiarizing "Genie". On May 19, 2010, Dutch singer Nathalie Makoma released her second single named "I Just Wanna Dance." However, Nathalie sings the original English lyrics that were written for the song. On June 3, 2011, British singer C.J. Lewis released an English version of "Genie".

In November 2012, Korean artist Goomrrat (Pasha) produced a fan-made skin for League of Legends champion Ahri, whose Classic version's dance emote is the dance from Run Devil Run, which was named Generation Ahri and featured Ahri in the Genie naval uniform outfit from the music video. By popular demand, developer Riot Games created an official equivalent based on it, Popstar Ahri, which was released worldwide on November 25, 2013, and has the dance from Genie as the dance emote.

Awards

Track listing
CD single – 
 "Genie" (Japanese version) – 3:44
 "Genie" (Korean version) – 3:49
 "Genie" (Without main vocal) – 3:44

DVD – 
 "Genie" (Music video)	 
 "Genie" (Music video – Dance version) (First Press only)

Credits and personnel
Credits are adapted from Korean album and Japanese CD single liner notes.

Studio 
 Recorded, mixed and digitally edited at SM Booming System
 Mastered at Sonic Korea

Personnel 
 SM Entertainment – executive producer 
 Girls' Generation – vocals, background vocals
 Lee Soo-man – producer
 Yoo Young-jin – producer, Korean lyrics, composition, mixing, recording, digital editing, vocal directing, background vocals, synthesizer, programming
 Kanata Nakamura – Japanese lyrics
 Yoo Han-jin – arrangement, background vocals
 Fujino Shigeki – Japanese mastering
 Nermin Harambašić - composer
 Fridolin Nordso – composer
 Anne Judith Wik – composer
 Robin Jenssen – composer
 Ronny Svendsen – composer
 Jeon Hoon – Korean mastering

Charts

Weekly charts

Year-end charts

Certifications

Notes

References

External links

2009 singles
2010 singles
Girls' Generation songs
Jinn in popular culture
Korean-language songs
Japanese-language songs
SM Entertainment singles
2009 songs
Bubblegum pop songs
Songs written by Yoo Young-jin